Luis Felipe Chará Zamora (born 6 January 1981), known as Felipe Chará, is a Colombian footballer who plays in Venezuela for Atlético Club Mineros de Guayana.

Career
Born in Cali, Chará began his football career with the youth side of Boca Juniors de Cali. He turned professional with Deportivo Pereira before moving to Atlético Nacional for several years. Next, he returned to his home-town club, Deportivo Cali.

He can play as a defensive midfielder. He has been capped for the Colombian sub 17 and sub 20 and sub 21.

Personal
Chará's brother, Diego Chará, is also a professional footballer who played for Deportivo Cali's rivals América de Cali. Diego currently plays for Portland Timbers of Major League Soccer. Chará's other brother, Yimmi Chará, also plays professionally for Portland Timbers.

Notes

References

External links
 
 
 

1981 births
Living people
Footballers from Cali
Colombian footballers
Colombia international footballers
Categoría Primera A players
Deportivo Pereira footballers
Atlético Nacional footballers
Deportivo Cali footballers
A.C.C.D. Mineros de Guayana players
Colombian expatriate footballers
Expatriate footballers in Venezuela
Association football defenders